Bellator 274: Gracie vs. Storley was a mixed martial arts event produced by Bellator MMA that took place on February 19, 2022 at the Mohegan Sun Arena in Uncasville, Connecticut.

Background 
No. 4-ranked Neiman Gracie took on No. 5-ranked Logan Storley in the main event in a clash of top-10 170-pounders. This marked the first time a non-title or non-grand prix tournament bout was five rounds in Bellator's history.

In the co-main bout former Bellator Welterweight Champion and No. 8-ranked Andrey Koreshkov was set to face Mukhamed Berkhamov. However, Berkhamov pulled out of the bout and was replaced by Chance Rencountre.

A women's flyweight bout between Veta Arteaga and Keri Taylor Melendez was scheduled for this event. However, the bout was scrapped for undisclosed reasons.

A light heavyweight bout between Christian Edwards and Kevin Haley was scheduled for this event. However, the bout was pulled after Edwards tested positive for COVID-19.

At the weigh-ins, Cody Herbert missed weight for his bout, weighing in at 188.6 pounds, 2.6 pounds over the middleweight non-title fight limit. The bout proceeded at catchweight and Herbert was fined a percentage of his purse, which went to his opponent Jordan Newman.

Results

See also 

 2022 in Bellator MMA
 List of Bellator MMA events
 List of current Bellator fighters
 Bellator MMA Rankings

References 

Bellator MMA events
Events in Uncasville, Connecticut
2022 in mixed martial arts
February 2022 sports events in the United States
2022 in sports in Connecticut
Mixed martial arts in Connecticut
Sports competitions in Connecticut